An enemy complex is in modern psychology a mental disorder in which a person falsely believes he or she is surrounded by enemies. Additional disorders of the mind generally accompanied with an enemy complex include paranoia and low-self esteem.

American historian Robert C. Tucker used the phrase in his 1988 book Stalin as Revolutionary to describe the mental state of Soviet dictator Joseph Stalin.

Mike Tyson described himself having an enemy complex. Thinking that his opponents and their coaches and trainers were his enemies.

References

See also
 Delusion
 Distrust

Psychosis
Paranoia